deGravelles may refer to:

Charles deGravelles (1913–2008), American oil tycoon and political activist, organizer, and candidate
Virginia deGravelles (1915–2017), American political activist and organizer, wife of Charles deGravelles
John W. deGravelles (born 1951), American federal district court judge, son of Charles and Virginia deGravelles.